The Czech Republic women's national basketball team represents the Czech Republic in international women's basketball. Their biggest success so far is the gold medal at the EuroBasket 2005. Czech Republic are one of the newest national basketball teams in the world, having split from the Czechoslovakia women's national basketball team after the dissolution of the unified state in 1993, with the Slovakia women's national basketball team continuing as the successor of the Czechoslovak team.

Competition record

Current roster
Roster for the EuroBasket Women 2021.

See also
 Czechoslovakia women's national basketball team
 Basketball in the Czech Republic

References

External links
 
Czech Republic at FIBA site
Czech Republic National Team – Women at Eurobasket.com

 
 
Women's national basketball teams